Anders Faugstad (born 13 November 1999) is a Norwegian compound archer. He won the silver medal in the men's individual compound event at the 2019 World Archery Championships held in 's-Hertogenbosch, Netherlands. In the final, he lost against James Lutz of the United States. In 2019, he also won the gold medal in the junior men's individual compound event at the World Youth Archery Championships held in Madrid, Spain.

In 2020, he finished in 2nd place in the inaugural Lockdown Knockout tournament organised by World Archery. In the final he lost against Sara López of Colombia. In 2021, he competed in the men's individual compound event at the World Archery Championships held in Yankton, United States.

References

External links 
 

Living people
1999 births
Place of birth missing (living people)
Norwegian male archers
World Archery Championships medalists
21st-century Norwegian people